C.P. Mohammed (Malayalam: സി.പി. മുഹമ്മദ്‌) (born 15 August 1952) is an Indian politician and was the MLA of Pattambi from 2001 to 2016.

He is the son of Shri C.P. Mohammed Haji and Smt. Beevi Fathima.

References 

1952 births
Living people
Members of the Kerala Legislative Assembly
People from Palakkad district
Indian National Congress politicians from Kerala